The Venturi Eclectic is a zero emission car, running on solar sourced electric power, from the French/ Monegasque car manufacturer Venturi owned by Gildo Pastor. It functions as a small renewable energy production and storage plant (with a roof mounted solar panel and its own wind turbine) and can be recharged at any outlet of the power grid. It was designed by Sacha Lakic.

The Eclectic concept appeared at the Paris Motor Show in 2006, and was mentioned in Time Magazine's Best Inventions of 2007. 

It is designed with 3 seats in a V-formation, with the driver at the apex, and has open sides.

Eclectic 2.0

The Eclectic 2.0 is designed on similar principles but is more compact. It has more limited accommodation but would be more readily driven (and parked) in a crowded urban environment. The Eclectic 2.0 was first revealed at the 2008 Paris Motor Show.

Production

2010 was a strategic year for Venturi with the launch of construction of an assembly plant for its electric vehicles in Sablé-sur-Sarthe. However, despite the planned production here of three types of electric vehicle (the Eclectic, the Voxan Wattman electric motorcycle, and a three-wheeler utility vehicle) the factory closed in 2015. The Eclectic nevertheless remains noteworthy as the first solar-powered car developed with mass production in mind.

References

External links 
Venturi Eclectic listed at  Electric Vehicle Info: Electric Car Model, Accessed 25 April 2018

Electric city cars
Venturi vehicles